Bourletiellidae is a family of springtails in the order Symphypleona.

References

External links 
 

Collembola
Arthropod families